Horatio is an unincorporated community in Jefferson County, in the U.S. state of Pennsylvania.

History
Horatio got its start circa 1887 as a mining community when a railroad line was extended to the mines at that point. A post office was established at Horatio in 1888, and remained in operation until 1920.

References

Unincorporated communities in Jefferson County, Pennsylvania
Unincorporated communities in Pennsylvania